Sir Rupert De la Bère, 1st Baronet,  (16 June 1893 – 25 February 1978) was a British businessman, soldier, and Conservative Party politician. He was the 625th Lord Mayor of London.

Biography
He was the son of Reginald De la Bère from Addlestone in Surrey,
educated at Tonbridge School, and during World War I served overseas with the East Surrey Regiment and the Royal Air Force.

After the war he became a director of Hay's Wharf and an Alderman of the City of London for the Tower ward.
He was elected a Sheriff of the City of London for 1941-42  and the Lord Mayor of London for 1952–53. He was the first member of the Skinners Company to hold the office of Lord Mayor since Sir Robert Kite in 1766, and no other Skinner has been Lord Mayor since.

He was elected at the 1935 general election as the Member of Parliament for Evesham,
and held the seat until the constituency was abolished at the 1950 general election. He was then elected for the new South Worcestershire constituency, and held that seat until he stood down at the  1955 general election.

He was knighted in June 1952, appointed Knight Commander of the Royal Victorian Order in the Coronation Honours of June 1953, and a baronet (of Crowborough) in November 1953. He was appointed Knight of the Order of the Dannebrog (Denmark), Knight of the Order of St. John of Jerusalem, and Knight of the Order of the Polar Star (Sweden).

In 1919, he married Marguerite Humphery, daughter of Sir John Humphery. She died in 1969.

References

External links 
 

1893 births
1978 deaths
Royal Air Force airmen
Military personnel from Surrey
People educated at Tonbridge School
Sheriffs of the City of London
20th-century lord mayors of London
20th-century English politicians
Conservative Party (UK) MPs for English constituencies
UK MPs 1935–1945
UK MPs 1945–1950
UK MPs 1950–1951
UK MPs 1951–1955
Knights Bachelor
Baronets in the Baronetage of the United Kingdom
East Surrey Regiment soldiers
Royal Air Force personnel of World War I
British Army personnel of World War I
Knights Commander of the Royal Victorian Order
Knights of the Order of St John
Knights of the Order of the Polar Star
Knights of the Order of the Dannebrog